

Events

January events
 January 25 – The Cincinnati, Cambridge and Chicago Short Line Railway, a predecessor of Pennsylvania Railroad, is incorporated in Indiana to build from New Castle southeast via Cambridge to the Ohio state line.
 January – The Memphis and Little Rock Railroad, the first railroad built in Arkansas is chartered.

February events 
 February 5 – The Mississippi and Missouri Railroad, a predecessor of the Chicago, Rock Island and Pacific Railroad, is established in Iowa to build a railroad between Davenport and Council Bluffs.

April events
 April 2 – The New York Central Railroad is formed through the merger of ten smaller railroads in the New York area.
 April 20 – Lord Dalhousie, Governor-General of India, resolves that trunk rail development in that country will be by private enterprise under close government supervision.

May events 
 May 6 – The Norwalk rail accident is the first major US railroad bridge disaster, killing 48.
 May 17 – The New York Central Railroad is formed through the merger of ten smaller railroads in New York under the direction of Erastus Corning.

July events 
 July 8 – The Northern Indiana Railroad is formed through the merger of several smaller railroads in Indiana and Ohio.
 July 18 – The Portland gauge Grand Trunk Railway is completed from Montreal to the ice-free seaport of Portland, Maine.

August events 
 August 1 – The original Acton station (renamed in 1920 to Acton Central) near London, England, opens.
 August 19 – The Lake Erie, Wabash and St. Louis Railroad, a predecessor of the Wabash Railroad, is incorporated in Indiana.

September events 
 September 20 – Indianapolis's Union Station, the first union station in the United States, opens.

October events
 October 1 – Bristol and Exeter Railway's Yeovil branch line is fully opened for passenger traffic.
 October 26 – Bristol and Exeter Railway's Yeovil branch line is fully opened for goods traffic.
 October – Homer Ramsdell succeeds Benjamin Loder as president of the Erie Railroad.

November events 
 November 1 – Canada West Railroad opens its first division connecting Niagara Falls to Hamilton, Ontario.
 November 7 – The Arkansas Midland Railroad is created by an act of the Arkansas legislature.
 November 10 – Canada's Great Western Railway opens the line from Hamilton, Ontario, to the suspension bridge at Niagara Falls.

December events
 December 17 – The Brooklyn City Railroad, the oldest streetcar line in Brooklyn, New York, is incorporated.

Unknown date events
 The Monon Railroad opens its  route between Chicago, Illinois, and Louisville, Kentucky
 American steam locomotive builder Manchester Locomotive Works opens.

Accidents

Births

April births 
 April 25 – John Frank Stevens, chief engineer and general manager of Great Northern Railway, vice president Chicago, Rock Island and Pacific Railroad (d. 1943).

October births 
 October 6 – Thomas George Shaughnessy, president of Canadian Pacific Railway Limited 1899–1918 (d. 1923).
 October 14 – John William Kendrick, chief engineer 1888–1893, general manager 1893–1899 and vice president 1899–1911 of Northern Pacific Railway and vice-chairman of the board for Atchison, Topeka and Santa Fe Railway (d. 1924).

Deaths

July deaths 
 July 24 – Hezekiah C. Seymour, chief engineer for Ontario, Huron and Lake Simcoe Railroad (b. 1811).

September deaths
 September 6 – George Bradshaw, English cartographer, printer and publisher and the originator of the railway timetable (b. 1800).

References